Bindloss  is a hamlet in southern Alberta, Canada within Special Area No. 2.

It is named after English author Harold Edward Bindloss, who wrote a number of Western novels. Little remains of the original town site.

On 11 September 2017, an attempt to dispose of unexploded ordnance at Canadian Forces Base Suffield led to a fire that burned 220 square kilometres on the base plus another 58 square kilometres beyond. Bindloss was affected by the fire, which led to the death of 260 head of cattle, either killed in the fire, or put down because they were so badly burned.

Climate
<div style="width:70%">

Demographics 
Bindloss recorded a population of 14 in the 1991 Census of Population conducted by Statistics Canada.

See also 
List of communities in Alberta
List of hamlets in Alberta

Notes

References 

Hamlets in Alberta
Special Area No. 2